Giorgos Katakouzinos was a Greek film director and screenwriter. He was born in Alexandria, Egypt on January 1, 1943 and died in Athens on August 13, 2013. He is mostly known for his film Angelos, a film shot in 1982, which dealt with the topic of homosexuality. The film was inspired by a real event that happened a few years earlier. The film is considered pretty daring for the early 1980s, because homosexuality was social stigma in conservative Greek society of those 
times. The film won three awards in Thessaloniki film festival among them the best film award. The second film Apousies (Absences) deals with a Greek bourgeois family in the early 20th century and won accolades in Valencia International Film Festival. His third film Zoe was also inspired by a real crime that had shocked Greek society in the late 1980s. He had also worked in Greek television.

Filmography
Angelos (1982)
Apousies (1987)
Zoe (1995)

References

External links

Greek film directors
Greek screenwriters
1943 births
2013 deaths
People from Alexandria